Hammer's German Grammar and Usage is an English reference book on German grammar. 

The 1st edition was published in 1971. The 5th edition was written by Martin Durrell. A review of the 2nd edition noted that the book "continues to be the most accurate and complete reference grammar available for advanced English-speaking learners of German".

References

1971 non-fiction books
Language textbooks
German grammar
German-language education